Ursus (also known as Mighty Ursus) is a 1961 Italian peplum film directed by Carlo Campogalliani. It was originally theatrically released in the US on a double bill with "Jack, the Giant Killer" (1962) before being sold to television in the U.S.  The film was later released to American television retitled Ursus, Son of Hercules as part of the Sons of Hercules TV syndication package (although Ursus was not related to Hercules at all in the original Italian version).

Filmed in Madrid in 1960, and released in Italy on Feb. 1, 1961, this movie stars bodybuilder Ed Fury as the legendary Ursus, and Moira Orfei as the evil queen Attea, in a sword-and-sandal adventure. Ed Fury is the actor most often associated with the Ursus series, although he only played him in three of the nine films. The film is rife with villains, in the true peplum tradition, including Moira Orfei as the evil queen, Luis Prendes as the smarmy Setas, and Rafael Luis Calvo as Mok, the grand vizier.

A young Soledad Miranda plays the beautiful virgin Fillide who is to be sacrificed at the end of the film. Miranda was later "discovered" by Spanish horror film director Jesus Franco who used her in a number of his 1969-1970 productions, beginning with his 1970 opus Count Dracula. (She was killed in a car accident in 1970).

Plot 
To defend his countrymen, the mighty Ursus goes off to war in a foreign land, a war that lasts several years. Victorious, he returns home planning to marry his fiancée Attea, only to learn that she had been kidnapped in his absence by a bizarre religious cult that inhabits a far off island. Ursus enlists the aid of a young blind slave girl, Doreide, whom he used to know as a child, and together they embark on a quest to locate and rescue his lost Attea. Unbeknownst to Ursus, Doreide is in love with him, but doesn't let Ursus know, since she feels he will only be happy if he is reunited with Attea.

After overcoming various villains who do not want him to locate the cult's island base, Ursus and Doreide finally arrive on the island, only to be captured by the cult and their masked queen, an evil woman who orders the sacrificing of virgins to her satanic bull-god.

Much to his dismay, Ursus learns that the queen is in fact his ex-fiancée Attea. After being kidnapped by the cult, Attea had somehow managed to trick the cultists into making her their leader, and over the past three years, she degenerated into a cold, heartless monster. The queen commands that Doreide be sacrificed, and Ursus is sent in chains to slave in a hellish work camp.

Ursus manages to escape his captivity and kill the treacherous Setas, an old friend of Ursus' who he learns orchestrated the kidnapping of Attea years before. Ursus then makes his way to the great arena, just in time to rescue Doreide from being mauled to death by a massive bull. Ursus physically wrestles the bull to the ground in a spectacular battle of sinews, and then leads a slave revolt against the queen and her sycophants. In the battle, Doreide receives a blow to the head which miraculously restores her vision. The queen is stabbed to death by her own grand vizier Mok, who in turn is strangled by Ursus.

With the freeing of the slaves, Ursus and Doreide sail off back to their homeland,
with Ursus finally realizing that Doreide is the only woman for him. (Strangely, none of the other Ursus films involve the Doreide character, so it's a mystery why she disappeared so quickly from the series after this first film.) Ursus is shown as a very violent character in this film, actually strangling several of the other characters to death in various scenes when he could easily have just rendered them unconscious.

Cast 
Ed Fury as Ursus
Mary Marlon as Doreide, the blind girl
Moira Orfei as Queen Attea
Cristina Gaioni as  Magali
Luis Prendes as  Setas
 Rafael Luis Calvo as  Mok
Mario Scaccia as  Kymos
Mariangela Giordano as  Myriam
 Nino Fuscagni as  Carovaniere
Soledad Miranda as Fillide, the virgin
 Antonio Gil as Adelfo

References

Bibliography

External links

1961 films
Italian fantasy adventure films
1960s fantasy adventure films
Peplum films
Films directed by Carlo Campogalliani
Sword and sandal films
1960s Italian-language films
1960s Italian films